Stephanie Powell Watts is an American author. She won a Whiting Award in 2013 and an Ernest J. Gaines Award for Literary Excellence in 2012 for her book We are Taking Only what We Need a collection of 11 stories which chronicles the lives of African-Americans in North Carolina. Her short fiction has been included in two volumes of the Best New Stories from the South anthology and honored with a Pushcart Prize.

Watts' debut novel, No One Is Coming to Save Us, was published by Ecco in 2017. The story follows the return of a successful native son to his home in North Carolina and his attempt to join the only family he ever wanted but never had. As Ms. Watts describes it, “Imagine The Great Gatsby set in rural North Carolina, nine decades later, with desperate black people.”

Life
Watts was born and raised in Lenoir, in the foothills of North Carolina. She received her BA from the University of North Carolina at Charlotte and her PhD from the University of Missouri. She now lives with her husband and son in Pennsylvania where she is an associate professor of English at Lehigh University.

Works
We are Taking Only what We Need BkMk Press, University of Missouri-Kansas City, 2011, 
No One Is Coming to Save Us, Ecco, 2017, 978-0062472984

References

External links

http://stephaniepowellwatts.com/
http://www.newletters.org/UserFiles/File/BkMk%20Author%20Interviews/Watts%20Interview.pdf
http://fictionwritersreview.com/interview/an-interview-with-stephanie-powell-watts/
http://blogs.umsl.edu/news/2012/12/10/powell-watts/

Year of birth missing (living people)
Living people
African-American women writers
Lehigh University faculty
People from Lenoir, North Carolina
University of Missouri alumni
University of North Carolina at Charlotte alumni
American women academics
21st-century African-American people
21st-century African-American women